A self-guided tour is a self-governing tour where one navigates a route oneself as opposed to an escorted tour where a tour guide directs the route, times, information, and places toured. Many tourist attractions provide suggestions, maps, instructions, directions, and items to see or do during self-guided tours.

As with escorted tours, self-guided tours may be conducted on foot or by vehicle. Audio tours are frequently presented in a self-guided format using booklets, smart phones or standalone handheld devices, as are virtual tours.

See also
Cell phone tour
GPS tour
Guide book
Walking tour

References

Tourist activities
Types of tourism